Hit Parade of 1951 is a 1950 American musical film directed by John H. Auer and written by Lawrence Kimble, Elizabeth Reinhardt and Aubrey Wisberg. The film stars John Carroll, Marie McDonald, Estelita Rodriguez, Frank Fontaine, Grant Withers and Mikhail Rasumny. The film was released on October 15, 1950, by Republic Pictures.

Plot

Cast   
 John Carroll as Joe Blake / Eddie Paul
 Marie McDonald as Michele
 Estelita Rodriguez as Chicquita
 Frank Fontaine as John L.O. 'Bingo' Sevony
 Grant Withers as Smokey
 Mikhail Rasumny as The Professor
 Michael St. Angel as Chuck
 Paul Cavanagh as Two-to-One Thompson
 Edward Gargan as Garrity
 Gus Schilling as Studio Guide
Rose Rosett as Rose
 Wade Crosby as Jake
 Duke York as Cal
 Al Murphy as George
 Firehouse Five Plus Two as Themselves
 Bobby Ramos and His Rumba Band as Themselves

References

External links 
 

1950 films
1950s English-language films
American musical films
1950 musical films
Republic Pictures films
Films directed by John H. Auer
American black-and-white films
Films with screenplays by Aubrey Wisberg
1950s American films